The 1984–85 UTEP Miners men's basketball team represented the University of Texas at El Paso as a member of the Western Athletic Conference during the 1984–85 college basketball season. The team was led by head coach Don Haskins. The Miners finished 22–10 (12–4 in WAC), lost in the semifinals of the conference tournament, and received an at-large bid to the NCAA tournament. As No. 11 seed in the West region, the Miners knocked off No. 6 seed Tulsa in the opening round before losing to NC State in the round of 32.

Roster

Schedule and results

|-
!colspan=9 style=| Non-conference Regular Season

|-
!colspan=9 style=| WAC Regular Season

|-
!colspan=9 style=| WAC tournament

|-
!colspan=9 style=| NCAA tournament

Rankings

References

UTEP Miners men's basketball seasons
Utep
Utep